This is an index listing Chilean films ordered by year of release.

1920s

1930s

1940s

1950s

1960s

1970s

1980s

1990s

2000s

2010s

2020s

See also 
List of Chilean actors

References

External links
Chilean film at the Internet Movie Database